The Manila Zoo, formally known as the Manila Zoological and Botanical Garden, is a  zoo located in Malate, Manila, Philippines.

History

The Manila Zoological and Botanical Garden first opened to the public on July 25, 1959, during the tenure of Manila Mayor Arsenio Lacson. Its inauguration was attended by First Lady Leonila Garcia. It is erroneously referred to as the oldest zoo in Asia by the Manila city government, partly for which it is marked as a city landmark, despite the establishment of Tokyo’s Ueno Zoo in Japan in 1882.

In the mid-2000s, People for the Ethical Treatment of Animals (PETA) launched a campaign against Manila Zoo calling for its closure as part of its global campaign against zoos. The animal rights organization supported plans to convert the zoo into a sports complex. The Manila city government led by Mayor Alfredo Lim, as well as local vendors operating in the zoo, opposed PETA's campaign against Manila Zoo.

Manila Zoo was indefinitely closed on January 23, 2019 by Manila Mayor Joseph Estrada after the Department of Environment and Natural Resources (DENR) identified it as a major pollutant of Manila Bay. The zoo was found to be dumping untreated sewage into an estuary that empties into the bay. Estrada's government planned to renovate the zoo, but the project was placed on hold. Animals which remained in captivity continued to be taken care of by zoo employees and volunteers despite the closure.

Plans to renovate the zoo once again surfaced following the election of Isko Moreno as Manila mayor, and in July 2020, a groundbreaking ceremony was held for the rehabilitation and redevelopment of the zoo. The project's budget was a reported  and was initially expected to be finished in 19 months. The zoo was planned to introduce a 30-foot lagoon waterfall, a big cat enclosure, a marsupial exhibit, a monkey enclosure, and a restaurant. The Zoo reopened on December 30, 2021.

As of January 19, 2022, the Zoo is temporarily used as a COVID-19 vaccination site for minors and senior citizens.

Animals

The Manila Zoological and Botanical Garden is home to more than 550 specimens of exotic wildlife, representing at least 13 species of mammals, 38 species of birds, and 21 species of reptiles.

Principal animals include an Asian elephant named Ma'ali (Vishwama'ali), and a White Siberian Tiger named Kois. The zoo formerly housed a hippopotamus named Queen Bertha, but it has since died in 2017 as the oldest captive hippopotamus in the world at age 65.

The zoo's animal collection is divided into four categories: mammals, birds, reptiles, and aquatic life.

Many of the animals of the zoo were born in captivity, with three month-old juveniles recently born in April 2015.

Plants 
The Manila Zoo's Botanical Garden nurtures more than 10,000 plants in its botanical garden.

Facilities 

 Animal Museum
 Zoo Lagoon
 Sewage Treatment Plant
 Botanical Garden
 Butterfly Garden
 Children's Park
 Reptile House
 Outdoor Reptiles

Former facilities

Wildlife Rescue Center
The Wildlife Rescue Center served as a temporary shelter and repository for confiscated, donated, retrieved, sick, injured and abandoned wildlife species. The Wildlife Rescue Center has been the subject of public scrutiny in regard to their animal welfare standards. The area was permanently closed on January 23, 2019.

Kinder Zoo

The Kinder Zoo within Manila Zoo was a result of a private-public partnership between Kinder Zoo, Inc. and the city government. Kinder Zoo, Inc. redeveloped  of the zoo into an area named Kinder Zoo. The area was designed as a child-friendly area where children can interact with some animals of the zoo. The area featured a butterfly sanctuary, a hanging bridge, a flamingo pond, a barn for events, and a petting zoo upon its opening on June 23, 2000. The area was permanently closed on January 23, 2019.

References

Zoos in Metro Manila
Botanical gardens in the Philippines
Parks in Manila
Buildings and structures in Malate, Manila
Tourist attractions in Manila
Zoos established in 1959
1959 establishments in the Philippines